General elections were held in Sierra Leone Colony and Protectorate in May 1957. A total of 39 seats were up for election, whilst another 12 paramount chiefs were indirectly elected.

The Sierra Leone People's Party led by Milton Margai won a majority of the elected seats, and gained the support of all 12 chiefs and eight of the ten independents. Margai led the country to independence in 1961.

Results

By area

References

Elections in Sierra Leone
Sierra Leone
1957 in Sierra Leone